The Italian Walk of Fame (IWOF) located in Toronto, Ontario, Canada, is a walk of fame that acknowledges the achievements and accomplishments of successful persons of Italian descent. The walk of fame is located in the downtown Little Italy district.  The IWOF consists of stars placed permanently and prominently in the sidewalk on the north side of College Street between Grace Street and Clinton Street.

History
It was co-founded by Jimi Bertucci and Marisa Lang, and launched on September 7, 2009.

Inductees

Past inductees include:

See also
 Italian Canadians in the Greater Toronto Area

External links 
 
 Toronto Sun
 Corriere Canadese

Culture of Toronto
Italian-Canadian culture
Walks of fame
Halls of fame in Canada